Lesbian, gay, bisexual, and transgender (LGBT) people in Indonesia face legal challenges and prejudices not experienced by non-LGBT residents. Traditional mores disapprove of homosexuality and transitioning, which impacts public policy. Indonesian same-sex couples and households headed by same-sex couples are not eligible for any of the legal protections available to opposite-sex married couples. Most parts of Indonesia do not have a sodomy law, and the country does not currently prohibit non-commercial, private and consensual sexual activity between members of the same-sex, yet there is no specific Indonesian law that protects the LGBT community against discrimination and hate crimes. In Aceh, homosexuality is illegal under Islamic Sharia law and it is punishable by flogging or imprisonment. Indonesia does not recognize same-sex marriage. 

In July 2015, the Minister of Religious Affairs stated that it is difficult for Indonesia to legalize same-sex marriage because deep-seated religious norms speak strongly against it. The importance in Indonesia for social harmony leads to an emphasis on duties over rights, meaning that human rights broadly, including LGBT rights, are very fragile. Despite this, the LGBT community in Indonesia has steadily become more visible and politically active.

Coming out to family and friends is seldom undertaken by LGBT people in Indonesia, as they are afraid of rejection and social backlash. Nevertheless, there are some rare cases of understanding and acceptance by the families of LGBT persons.

Despite Indonesia's reputation as a relatively moderate Muslim country, in the 21st century sharia-supporting fundamentalist Muslim groups have gained increasing support. As a result, LGBT people have faced growing hostility and intolerance, including attacks and discrimination. In early 2016, LGBT people and activists in Indonesia faced fierce opposition, homophobic attacks and hate speech, even launched by Indonesian authorities. In February 2016, Human Rights Watch urged the Indonesian government to defend the rights of LGBT people and publicly condemn officials' discriminatory remarks.

In 2017, two young gay men (aged 20 and 23) were sentenced to being caned in front of the public in the Aceh province. In 2017, police launched multiple raids on gay saunas under the pretext of pornography-related offences. In May 2017, 141 men were arrested for a "gay sex party" in the capital Jakarta. However, only ten charged. Another raid took place in October 2017, when Indonesian police raided a sauna in Central Jakarta popular with gay men, arresting 51 people, although only six were charged, including the spa owner. An over-broad interpretation of the Pornography Act, coupled with government inaction, has enabled the police to use it in targeting LGBT people.

Legality of same-sex sexual activity
In December 2022, the Indonesian House of Representatives has passed a bill that outlaws sex outside of marriage between heterosexuals. However, the President has not yet signed the bill into law. The spokesperson for the draft bill stated that, the draft bill will not criminalize private same-sex sexual acts of LGBT persons. At present, the current Criminal Code which does not criminalize extramarital relations are still in force.
 Currently, unlike its neighbouring commonwealth country, Malaysia, Indonesia does not explicitly have a sodomy law. The national Criminal Code does not prohibit non-commercial, private and consensual sexual activity between two consenting adults of the same-sex. A national bill seeking to criminalize same-sex sexual activity, along with cohabitation, adultery and the practice of witchcraft, failed to be enacted in 2003 and no subsequent bill has been reintroduced.

Indonesia allows one of its provincial government to establish specific sharia-based laws, such as criminal sanctions for homosexuality. These local penalties exist in the province of Aceh, where a bylaw against LGBT rights have been passed. These sharia-based criminal codes permit up to 100 lashes or up to 100 months in prison for consensual same-sex sexual activity. In May 2017, two gay men, aged 20 and 23, in the Aceh province were each sentenced to a public caning of 83 lashes for having consensual sex in private.

While Indonesia itself has allowed private and consensual sexual activity between members of the same sex since 1993, at an 18 years of age.

The Constitution does not explicitly address sexual orientation or gender identity. It does guarantee all citizens various legal rights, including equality before the law, equal opportunity, humane treatment in the workplace, religious freedom, freedom of opinion, peaceful assembly, and association.

While homosexuality itself is legal, the government has taken specific steps to censor films and other media content that is deemed to be "promoting" homosexuality. In 2016, the government announced plans to ban several websites and computer applications that promotes homosexuality.

Calls for discrimination and criminalization
The most active opposition against the recognition of LGBT rights in Indonesia has come from religious authorities and pressure-groups, especially Islamic organisations. Indonesian Ulema Council (Majelis Ulama Indonesia or MUI) has made a statement, which stigmatised the LGBT population by declaring them "deviant" and an affront to the "dignity of Indonesia".

In 2005, the Indonesian government gave Aceh Province the right to introduce Sharia Law, albeit only to Muslim residents. The northernmost province of Aceh proceeded to enact a sharia-based anti-homosexuality law that punishes anyone caught having gay sex with 100 lashes. The law was set for enforcement by the end of 2015. Another example is the city of Palembang which introduced jail and fines for homosexual sex (though the laws are disbanded as of 2020.) Under the law, homosexuality is defined as an act of "prostitution that violates the norms of common decency, religion, and legal norms as they apply to societal rule." The following acts are defined as acts of prostitution: homosexual sex, lesbian sex, sodomy, sexual harassment and other pornographic acts.

In March 2015, Indonesian Ulema Council (Majelis Ulama Indonesia or MUI) issued a fatwa, or religious edict, called for same-sex acts to be punished by caning, and in some instances, the death penalty. The fatwa considers homosexuality a curable disease and says homosexual acts "must be heavily punished."

Indonesian People's Representative Council (DPR) has dismissed the suggestion that the death penalty would be introduced for same-sex acts, citing that it is quite impossible to implement that policy in Indonesia. The DPR said that the MUI fatwa only serves as moral guidance to adherents, not as positive law, since legal power is only possessed by the state.

In March 2016, the wake of surging anti-LGBT sentiments which started in early in 2016,parties like the Prosperous Justice Party (PKS) and the United Development Party (PPP) proposed an anti-LGBT bill to ban LGBT rights activism and criminalise LGBT behaviour. Various politicians made statements against the LGBT community in following months that year.

In late November 2016, the Islamic Defenders Front (FPI) tipped off police in Jakarta that there was a "sex party". The police then raided the gay gathering, charging the men with violating the national law against pornography, which is very broadly written.

On 21 May 2017, police detained 144 people in a raid on a gay sauna, Atlantis Gym Jakarta. The Indonesian Ulema Council made a statement that such activity is blasphemy against religion and an insult against Indonesian culture. "What kind of logic that able to accept this kind of sexual deviation, even animals are not gay. This is clearly not about equality," as stated by the Head of Law Department of MUI. He made his remarks even though homosexuality has been observed in more than 1,500 animal species. Earlier in the same month, 14 men were arrested at a "gay party" in Surabaya.

On 14 December 2017, the Constitutional Court of Indonesia issued a 5–4 ruling rejecting a petition by the conservative Family Love Alliance which sought to amend the Indonesian Criminal Code to make gay sex and sex outside of marriage illegal. There were three articles of the Indonesian Criminal Code (KUHP) petitioned for review, namely article 248 on adultery, article 285 on rape, and article 292 on child abuse. Under article 292 of the Criminal Code, child sexual abuse is a crime, both heterosexual or homosexual conducts. The petitioner sought to erase the term "underage" in article 292, in order to persecute all same-sex sexual conducts of all ages, including among consenting adults. Which meant the petitioner sought to criminalise homosexuality. The court rejected to amend the law and held that the issue was a matter of the Indonesian legislature.

Since January 2018, as part of revising the criminal code, lawmakers have been working on a criminal code draft. Despite the international criticism and the human rights organisations fears, if passed, the law would criminalise consensual sex between two unmarried people, cohabitation, adultery and rape. It will also enable lesbian, gay, bisexual or transgender people to be taken to court for their sexual orientation.

In late September 2019, the outgoing People's Representative Council's plan to pass the revised criminal code (RKUHP) was met with widespread student demonstrations on 23, 24 and 25 September 2019. The revision of the Criminal Code (RKUHP) is increasingly discriminating against LGBT people. Article 421 (1) concerning obscenity explicitly mentions the same-sex acts: "Everyone who commits obscene acts against other people of the same sex in public is convicted with a maximum imprisonment of 1 year and six months or a maximum fine of category III." The explicit mention of "same sex" obscenity is feared triggering discriminatory treatment and will generate bylaws that particularly targeting LGBT people. As the response on this widespread opposition, the government have either postponed or  intercepted this controversial revised criminal code.

Recognition of same-sex relationships

Indonesian law does not recognise same-sex marriage, civil unions or domestic partnerships.

Military service 
There is no military law that clearly states that LGBT people are prohibited from joining the military. However, several soldiers were fired because they were caught having same-sex sexual activity under the ST/1648–2019 telegram.

Some of them were also imprisoned for allegedly "disobeying a service order". Aprilio Manganang becoming the first service member in 2021 to legally change gender from female to male, although his case was intersex and assigned female at birth and was raised as a girl.

In December 2022, it was reported that soldiers within the Indonesian military - who have engaged in "consenting gay sex between adults in private" are facing jail time (by a crackdown from the government).

Adoption and family planning

Same-sex couples are not eligible to adopt a child in Indonesia. Only married couples consisting of a husband and a wife can adopt.
 
Even though the Indonesian law requires only married couples consisting of a husband and a wife can adopt, adoption by single people regardless of sexual orientation or gender identity is allowed and there have been no laws prohibiting it.

Discrimination protections
As of 2019, no specific law exists to protect Indonesia citizens from discrimination or harassment based on their sexual orientation or gender identity. Nevertheless, government agencies are slowly starting to enact anti-discrimination policies. The Attorney General's Office recently rescinded a public job offer declaring LGBT persons need not apply because of mental insanity after being advised by the National Commission on Human Rights.

In March 2019, a 30-year-old Indonesian police brigadier known as TT filed a case in the Semarang State Administrative Court in Central Java against the provincial police alleging a violation of the law on discrimination claiming he was fired for being gay after colleagues forcefully outed him and his partner. He also filed a complaint to the human rights commission. In May 2019, the court rejected the lawsuit. His lawyer said the panel of judges decided that they could not continue examining the case because TT should have first appealed the dismissal to the authorities within the Central Java Police when he received the termination letter before resorting to filing a lawsuit.

Though Indonesia does not explicitly have discrimination protections enshrined by the Indonesian constitution, the Indonesian police authorities ruled a circular letter since 2015 that it would process any hate speech related to sexual orientations and gender identity. The Indonesian government have stated that in a democratic country, every citizen has the right to express and think and that it will be protected and provided by the state. The main purpose to eradicate hate speech is to protect and control a harmonious social life in a heterogenous society. Similarly, the Regulation of the Head of the National Police of the Republic of Indonesia Number 8 of 2009 stipulates the duty of the police to protect the special rights of minority groups, including in the terms of sexual orientation. On the other hand, while not explicitly mentioned in the constitution, theoretically there is a guarantee of protection against discriminatory practices in employment based on any ground in the Constitution and the Human Rights Law (No. 39/1999).

Gender identity and expression

Transgender identity (also called waria) has long been part of Indonesian culture and society. While transgender people in Indonesia are generally more accepted than gays, lesbians and bisexuals, they have, in recent years, faced growing discrimination and rejection, mostly from sharia-supporting Muslim groups, which have become more and more popular in Indonesia. The status of transvestite, transsexual or other transgender persons in Indonesia is complex. Cross-dressing is not, per se, illegal and some public tolerance is given to some transgender people working in beauty salons or the entertainment industry, most notably the celebrity talk show host Dorce Gamalama. Transgender people are allowed to change their legal gender on official documents after undergoing sex reassignment surgery and after receiving a judge's approval. Individuals who undergo such surgery are later capable of marrying people of the opposite legal gender.

Discrimination and harassments directed at transgender people is not uncommon, though violence is quite rare. Indonesian law does not explicitly protect transgender people from discrimination or harassment. Transgender people who do not hide their gender identity often find it challenging to maintain legitimate employment and thus are often forced into prostitution and other illegal activities to survive. The Islamic Indonesian Ulama Council ruled that transgender persons must live in the gender that they were born with. "If they are not willing to cure themselves medically and religiously", said a Council member, they must be willing "to accept their fate to be ridiculed and harassed." However, the Indonesian judicial system takes the contrary position, with cases like Vivian Rubiyanti Iskandar (the first trans Indonesian to be legally recognized as female) giving rise to legal recognition of trans Indonesians' actual genders by the State. There have also been cases where perpetrators of hate crimes against the transgender community were arrested and prosecuted by the Indonesian authorities.

Recent developments 
In 2012, Yuli Retoblaut, a fifty-year-old transgender person and U.S. President Barack Obama's nanny for two years, publicly applied to be the head of the nation's National Commission on Human Rights. The city of Yogyakarta has the only madrasa for transgender people in the world. In January 2018, transgender women were arrested, stripped naked, had their heads shaved, and were publicly shamed in the province of Aceh. Later in March, the Jakarta Social Agency declared waria to be socially dysfunctional. Sources reported that "the agency regularly conducted raids against transgender women". Detained trans individuals are taken by the agency to city-owned "rehabilitation" centres, where they are incarcerated, along with homeless people, beggars, and street buskers, and only released if documentation stating their lack of homelessness was received, and a statement is signed where the individual promises not to repeat their "offence". Officials have stated this is being done to create a deterrent against being transgender, and that continued violations will result in jail time.

Since June 2021, the Ministry of Home Affairs has conducted outreach efforts to issue transgender Indonesians with identification papers, including a Kartu Tanda Penduduk. Transgender residents of Banten, West Java, Central Java, East Java, North Sumatra, South Sumatra, South Sulawesi, Lampung, and Papua have benefited so far. The stated reasoning was that many of them were undocumented, especially where their families did not approve of them (in Indonesia, the family register is an essential identification paper), leaving them without access to work or social services. The Ministry also stated that only the "male" and "female" sex descriptors would be recognized for the time being, with no option for a third gender / X designator, and that transgender Indonesians would have their gender at birth printed unless they had already obtained recognition from the courts.

Conversion therapy 
Conversion therapy, commonly called "rehabilitation", is not regulated but not criminalized. There was an attempt to legalize conversion therapy, in a draft titled "RUU Ketahanan Keluarga" (means "Drafted Law of Family Resilience") but got rejected by 5 factions out of 9 factions. Some city governments de facto legalized coversion therapy.

Living conditions
86% of Indonesian citizens identifies themselves as Muslim. According to the Ministry of Health (Indonesia) in 2012, Indonesia has around 1 million MSMs both visible or not. More than 5% of them of which are diagnosed with HIV. Whereas its estimated, that Indonesia has around 31 thousand Transgender women. It is estimated that the LGBT community constitutes around 3% of the Indonesian population, which is around 8 million. The family policy of the authorities, the social pressure to marry and religion means that homosexuality is generally not supported. Both modernist and traditionalist Muslims as well also other religious groups such as Christians, especially Roman Catholics, generally oppose homosexuality. Many Islamic fundamentalist groups such as the FPI (Islamic Defenders Front) are openly hostile towards LGBT people by attacking the home or work of those they believe are a threat to the values of Islam.

Explicit discrimination and violent homophobia are carried out mainly by religious extremists, while subtle discrimination and marginalisation occur in daily life among friends, family, at work or school. LGBT people often suffer abuse by the hands of the police, but it is hard to document due to victims refusing to give statements due to their sexuality. LGBT people are often arrested or charged due to their sexual orientation. Gays in jails are often sexually abused due to their sexual orientation, and often do not report it due to being traumatised and fear of being sent back to prison to suffer further abuse.

Indonesia does have a reputation as being a relatively moderate and tolerant Muslim nation, which does have some application to LGBT people. There are some LGBT people in the media, and the national government has allowed a discreet LGBT community to exist, who sometimes organises public events. However, conservative Islamic social mores tend to dominate within the broader society. Homosexuality and cross-dressing remain taboo and periodically LGBT people become the targets of fanatical vigilante groups.

In January 2018, the Aceh police ransacked a parlour with support from the Aceh autonomous government. The police tortured all LGBT citizens within the premises of the parlour, shaved the heads of transgender women, stripped their shirts and bras, and paraded them in the street while forcing them to shout "to become men". The event was criticised by human rights organisation.

According to Planet Romeo in 2015, Indonesia has a low abuse rate toward LGBT people. Indonesia ranked 73 on Gay Happiness Index, surpassing Malaysia at 77 and India at 81. Low public opinions is the reason why Indonesia is ranked low, despite having bigger public behaviour score comparing countries that ranked higher than Indonesia.

Media
The Law Against Pornography and Pornoaction (2006) prohibits "…any writing or audio-visual presentation – including songs, poetry, films, paintings, and photographs that show or suggest sexual relations between persons of the same sex." Those in violation of the law could be fined or sentenced to prison for up to seven years. However, the media is now giving homosexuality more media coverage in Indonesia.

In February 2016, the public discourse and debates on homosexuality and LGBT issues intensified with the occurrence of high-profile cases of alleged homosexual misconducts, involving Indonesian celebrities. First, an accusation of sexual approach and harassment by TV personality Indra Bekti upon several men. Followed by the case of dangdut singer Saiful Jamil, who has been named a suspect in a sexual assault involving an underage male fan.

Until recently, the depiction of LGBT people was quite visible in Indonesian media, especially in television, with famous TV personalities, hosts, artist and celebrities with effeminate demeanour, or even cross-dressers were quite common in Indonesian television shows. However, after the alleged homosexual scandals involving Indonesian celebrities, in March 2016, the national broadcasting commission emphasised a policy banning TV and radio programs that make LGBT behaviour appear "normal", saying this was to protect children and teenagers who are "susceptible to imitating deviant LGBT behaviours". This meant that broadcast companies, especially television stations, are discouraged from featuring effeminate figures, transgender people or cross-dressing in their programs, although such practices were previously quite common in Indonesian TV shows, especially TV variety shows and lawak (comedy) performances.

Political party opinions
Most of major political parties and politicians remain silent in the cause of LGBT rights. Islamist parties like Prosperous Justice Party (PKS) and United Development Party (PPP) spoke strongly against LGBT rights and went further to propose a national bill to criminalise LGBT. In March 2016, PKS and PPP proposed an anti-LGBT bill to ban LGBT activism, and criminalise LGBT rights and behaviour. National Mandate Party (PAN), despite sharing anti-LGBT right sentiments with PKS and PPP however, has asked people not to discriminate and harass the LGBT community. However, in return, the party also urged LGBT people not to promote LGBT rights in Indonesia.

Currently, no political party in Indonesia has openly supported the LGBT rights movement. However, in October 2016, President Joko Widodo stated that he is a defender of LGBT rights and that LGBT people should have the right not to be discriminated against. Also, some politicians from the PDI-P (Party for the Indonesian Democracy Struggle) and the moderately conservative PKB (National Awakening Party) has sympathised support for LGBT rights. PDI-P further stated that as a pluralist party, they could accept the existence of LGBT people. Despite holding that it is deviant behaviour, PDI-P has urged people to tolerate LGBT people and not extend hostile sentiments against them.

LGBT rights movement in Indonesia

In 1982, the first gay rights interest group was established in Indonesia. "Lambda Indonesia" and other similar organisations arose in the late 1980s and 1990s. Today, some of the major LGBT associations in the nation include "GAYa NUSANTARA" and "Arus Pelangi".

The gay and lesbian movement in Indonesia is one of the oldest and largest in Southeast Asia. Lambda Indonesia activities included organising social gatherings, consciousness-raising and created a newsletter, but the group dissolved in the 1990s. Gaya Nusantara is a gay rights group which focuses on homosexual issues such as AIDS. Another group is the Yayasan Srikandi Sejati, which was founded in 1998. Their primary focus is health issues about transgender people, and their work includes providing HIV/AIDS counselling and free condoms to transgender sex workers at a free health clinic. There are now over thirty LGBT groups in Indonesia.

Yogyakarta, Indonesia, hosted a 2006 summit on LGBT rights that produced the Yogyakarta Principles on the Application of International Human Rights Law in Relation to Sexual Orientation and Gender Identity. However, a summit in March 2010 in Surabaya was met with condemnation from the Islamic Defenders Front and was disrupted by conservative protesters.

By 2015, the victory of LGBT rights movement in Western countries has had significant implications in Indonesia. As numerous influential Western countries began legalising same-sex marriage since 2001, the LGBT rights issue has caught the attention and awareness of the general public in Indonesia and generated public discourse. The popular opinion split into several stances, and the main reaction was not positive. The right-wing elements in Indonesian politics, especially religious-based political parties and organisation have publicly condemned LGBT rights. Some argued that currently, Indonesia is under the threat of global LGBT "propaganda", which promotes an "LGBT lifestyle". Same-sex marriage or civil union became the main issue discussed in public regarding LGBT rights, although LGBT activists have argued that currently they do not fight for same-sex marriage, but simply seek the fundamental human rights of security, freedom from fear and freedom of assembly.

The comic Alpantuni depicts a gay Indonesian character who faces anti-LGBT sentiment featuring Muslim characters. Its Instagram account later was shut down by authorities. However, he was able to reactivate it later.

In response to a proposed bill meant to mandate conversion therapy to individuals suspected of being LGBT, queer-identifying Indonesian musician/songwriter Kai Mata "generat[ed] media buzz for being the first openly gay musician in Indonesia," vocally out amidst government hostility and harsh public sentiment.  The comments section echoed support from the international community, hope from closeted Indonesians, and backlash from other citizens, telling her "I’m Indonesian and normal, please leave the country if you do not want to undergo therapy and recover."

HIV/AIDS
Legal guidelines regarding HIV/AIDS do not exist, although AIDS is a significant problem in most countries in the region. Those infected with HIV traveling to Indonesia can be refused entry or threatened with quarantine. Due to the lack of sex education in Indonesian schools, there is little knowledge of the disease among the general population. Some organisations, however, do offer sex education, though they face open hostility from school authorities. At the beginning of the gay rights movement in Indonesia, LGBT organisations focused exclusively on health issues which led to the public believing that AIDS was a "gay disease" and led to LGBT people being stigmatised.

Opposition
Traditionally, Indonesians are quite tolerant towards LGBT people who keep quiet and stay discreet about their private lives. However, this level of tolerance is not extended towards the LGBT rights movements, which has faced fierce condemnation in the public sphere from Indonesian authorities. A wave of anti-LGBT rhetoric began in January 2016 when Higher Education Minister Mohamad Nasir said LGBT people should be barred from university campuses. The Minister called for a ban on gay groups on university campuses after a group of University of Indonesia (UI) students established a counselling and support group called the Support Group and Resource Center on Sexuality Studies (SGRC). The group was meant as a counselling service, resource centre and support group on sexuality and gender issues, especially for LGBT youth and students, who often suffer from abuses, harassment, violence and discrimination regarding their gender and sexuality. SGRC sees LGBT people as human beings who need a friend and protection. The group, which sought to advocate for those who suffer from gender-based violence, explained that they do not "turn" or "encourage" people to be gay, nor had they tried to "cure" gay people. Amid the heat of the issue, the University of Indonesia refused to be held responsible for SGRC's actions and announced the group was not an officially registered student organisation. Another official pressured smartphone instant-messaging services to drop gay and lesbian-themed emoji, prompting one company to comply.

Generally, religious authorities in Indonesia condemn homosexual acts and are fiercely against the LGBT rights movement. The most active opposition has come from majority-Islamic groups, with Majelis Ulama Indonesia, the country's top Muslim clerical body, calling for the criminalisation of homosexuality. Other religious groups, such as Christianity and specifically Roman Catholicism, have expressed their rejection of LGBT rights in Indonesia. Indonesian Catholic authorities have reiterated that Catholicism does not recognise same-sex marriage but assured that, despite their perceived transgressions, LGBT people should be protected and not harmed.

The Indonesia Psychiatric Association (PDSKJI) classifies homosexuality, bisexuality and transgenderism as mental disorders. Referring to Law No.18/2014 on Mental Health and the association's Mental Health and Mental Disorder Diagnostic Guidelines, the PDSKJI categorises homosexual and bisexual Indonesians as "people with psychiatric problems" and transgender people as having "mental disorders".

Some military figures have used conspiracy theory rhetoric. Defense Minister Ryamizard Ryacudu called the LGBT movement a "proxy war" to brainwash Indonesians, and claimed that it received "foreign funding", pointing to funds from United Nations organisations like UNAIDS or Western governments and foundations.

There have been a few incidents of LGBT people being harassed. LGBT groups are now working on setting up safe houses and draw up evacuation plans in case of need. In Yogyakarta, in February 2016, 23 LGBT activists were roughed up by police, who told local media they stopped them from holding a rally to avoid a clash with a hardline Muslim group holding an anti-LGBT protest nearby.

The chair of the People's Consultative Assembly, Zulkifli Hasan mentioned in a statement that, "As a movement, the existence of LGBT must be opposed. We must limit its room to move. However, as individual people, they must be protected like any other citizen.” Anthropologist Sharyn Graham Davies commented that the main focus of this opposition was that sexual and gender diversity may be tolerated but as long as LGBT people remain invisible in the Indonesian society and did not form a visible movement. On the other hand, amid fierce hostilities, some officials – including former Governor of Jakarta, Basuki Tjahaja Purnama and former Political, Legal, and Security Affairs Minister Luhut Binsar Panjaitan — have defended the LGBT community. "Whoever they are, wherever they work, he or she continues to be an Indonesian citizen. They have the right to be protected as well," Panjaitan said. President Joko Widodo has also expressed support for LGBT rights and has called on an end to discrimination.

In 2018, the city of Pariaman in Sumatra passed a public indecency law to fine its gay and transgender residents 1m Indonesian rupiah ($70) for disturbing "public order" by banning "acts that are considered LGBT" in public. The regulation forbids "immoral acts" between same-sex couples and prohibits residents from "acting as a transvestite" in public. Several cities in West Sumatra have taken steps to marginalise LGBT groups.

In June 2019, the head of Indonesia's population and family planning agency Nofrijal has labelled LGBT citizens the "main enemy of national development".

Public opinion
According to a 2017 poll carried out by ILGA, 32% of Indonesians agreed that gay, lesbian and bisexual people should enjoy the same rights as straight people, while 47% disagreed. Additionally, 37% agreed that they should be protected from workplace discrimination. 38% of Indonesians, however, said that people who are in same-sex relationships should be charged as criminals, while 37% disagreed. As for transgender people, 49% agreed that they should have the same rights, 55% believed they should be protected from employment discrimination, and 41% believed they should be allowed to change their legal gender.

Results online conducted by the ILGA in October 2016 shows that 69% of Indonesians oppose same-sex marriage, 14% support, while 17% have stated a neutral view.

According to the SMRC national survey, 58% of Indonesians agreed that LGBT people have the right to live as citizens, whereas 46% of Indonesians would accept if their family members came out as a part of the LGBT community.

Summary table

See also

 Homosexuality in Indonesia
 Human rights in Indonesia
 LGBT rights in Asia
 LGBT rights in Oceania
 Recognition of same-sex unions in Indonesia

Notes

References

External links
 GAYa NUSANTARA LGBT community support group in Indonesia
 Arus Pelangi promoting LGBT rights and awareness in Indonesia
 Tom Boellstorff: The Gay Archipelago
 Between Religion and Desire: Being A Gay Muslim in Indonesia
 UK government travel advice for Indonesia: Local laws and customs

LGBT rights in Indonesia
Indonesia
Indonesia
Law of Indonesia